Dioulatièdougou is a town in north-western Ivory Coast. It is a sub-prefecture and commune of Odienné Department in Kabadougou Region, Denguélé District. The border of Woroba District is nearby to the southeast.

In 2014, the population of the sub-prefecture of Dioulatièdougou was 8,028.

Villages
The 15 villages of the sub-prefecture of Dioulatièdougou and their population in 2014 are:

References

Sub-prefectures of Kabadougou
Communes of Kabadougou